Cete is a Portuguese freguesia ("civil parish") of the municipality of Paredes. The population in 2011 was 3,113, in an area of 4.68 km².

References

Freguesias of Paredes, Portugal